Whitleyville is an unincorporated rural village in Jackson County, Tennessee, United States. Whitleyville has a small bank branch office, and a post office serving ZIP code 38588, as well as several scattered residences separated by farm fields and open grassland.

References

Unincorporated communities in Jackson County, Tennessee
Unincorporated communities in Tennessee